Zune Yu Ya Oo (born 12 February 2001) is a Burmese footballer who plays as a defender for the Myanmar women's national team.

See also
List of Myanmar women's international footballers

References

2001 births
Living people
Women's association football defenders
Burmese women's footballers
People from Magway Division
Myanmar women's international footballers